XHWL-FM (103.7 MHz) is a radio station in Nuevo Laredo, Tamaulipas, Mexico.

The station signed on in 1950 as XERG-AM and changed its call sign in 1959.

In April 2018, XEWL began its second-wave AM to FM migration by signing on 103.7 XHWL-FM.

References

Radio stations in Nuevo Laredo
Radio stations in Laredo, Texas